McGregor is a surname. Notable people with the surname include:

 Ali McGregor, Australian opera soprano
 Alistair McGregor, Scottish field hockey goalkeeper
 Allan McGregor, Scottish footballer
 Andrew McGregor (1867–?), Scottish footballer
 Bryan McGregor (born 1984), Canadian professional ice hockey player
 Callum McGregor, Scottish footballer
 Cate McGregor, Australian military officer
 Chris McGregor, South African pianist
 Conor McGregor (born 1988), Irish mixed martial artist and 2 times UFC Champion
 Darren McGregor, Scottish footballer
 Dion McGregor, American songwriter
 Donald Morris McGregor (1923–2003), Canadian politician
 Don McGregor, American comic book writer
 Dugald McGregor, Australian rugby league footballer
 Duncan McGregor (politician), American politician
 Douglas McGregor, American business theorist and management professor
 Ewan McGregor, Scottish actor
 Fiona McGregor, Australian writer and performance artist
 Freddie McGregor, Jamaican singer
 Gordon McGregor, Canadian, president of Air Canada and Trans Canada Airlines
 Gordon Morton McGregor, Canadian, founded Ford Motor Company of Canada, Limited
 Gregor McGregor, Scottish-born Australian politician
 Helen McGregor (geologist) (born 1972), Australian geologist and climate change researcher
 Helen McGregor (writer), English writer
 James Lewin McGregor, Canadian mathematician
 Jane McGregor, Canadian actress
 Jordan McGregor, Scottish footballer
 Katie McGregor, American athlete
 Keli McGregor (1962–2010), Colorado Rockies president
 Neil McGregor (disambiguation)
 Paul McGregor (disambiguation)
 Rona McGregor, Canadian female curler
 Ronald Stuart McGregor (1929–2013), philologist from New Zealand
 Scott McGregor (disambiguation)

 Steven McGregor, Australian filmmaker
 Wayne McGregor, British choreographer
 William McGregor (football), Scottish founder of the English Football League
 William McGregor (politician), Canadian politician
 William B. McGregor, Australian linguist

Fictional characters:
 Mr. McGregor, character created by Beatrix Potter for the children's book entitled The Tale of Peter Rabbit
 Callum McGregor, main character from Malorie Blackman's novel Noughts + Crosses and portrayed by Jack Rowan in the BBC adaptation of the novel

See also
MacGregor (surname)

References

Scottish surnames
Patronymic surnames
Surnames from given names